Tangxi railway station may refer to:
, torn down to make way for the Guangzhou Baiyun railway station
, a disused station in Tangxi, Jinhua